Lowell A. Nelson (February 4, 1918 – August 8, 1986) was a member of the Wisconsin State Assembly.

Biography
Nelson was born on February 4, 1918, in Grantsburg, Wisconsin. He became a farmer.

Political career
Nelson was a member of the Assembly from 1957 to 1958. He was a Republican.

References

External links

People from Grantsburg, Wisconsin
1918 births
1986 deaths
20th-century American politicians
Republican Party members of the Wisconsin State Assembly